Ayyan is a 2011 Indian Tamil-language drama film. It was written and directed by Kendiran Muniyaswamy, and produced by S. Shekar Rajan under the banner of S. S. Pictures. It stars Vaasan Karthik (Singamuthu's son) and the debutant Divya Padmini . Ilayaraja composed the film's music.

Cast
 Vaasan Karthik
 Divya Padmini as Selvi
 Singamuthu
 Shanmugarajan
 Mahadevan
 Muthukaalai
 Crane Manohar

Soundtrack
The music of the film is composed by Ilayaraja.

References

External links
 

2011 films
Indian drama films
2011 drama films
Films scored by Ilaiyaraaja
2010s Tamil-language films